The 2015 FIVB Volleyball Women's U20 World Championship was the eighteenth edition of the FIVB Volleyball Women's U20 World Championship, which was hosted by Puerto Rico from 11 to 19 September 2015 in the cities of Caguas, Gurabo, Juncos and Maunabo.

Dominican Republic defeated Brazil 3-2 in the final to claim their first title. This marked the first world title for Dominican Republic at any age group. Brayelin Martínez was elected the Most Valuable Player.

Qualification
The FIVB Sports Events Council confirmed a proposal to streamline the number of teams participating in the Age Group World Championships on 14 December 2013.

 withdrew from the tournament.

Pools composition
The drawing of lots was held in Carolina, Puerto Rico on 1 July 2015. Numbers in brackets denote the World ranking as of December 2014.

Squads

Venues

Pool standing procedure
 Number of matches won
 Match points
 Sets ratio
 Points ratio
 Result of the last match between the tied teams

Match won 3–0 or 3–1: 3 match points for the winner, 0 match points for the loser
Match won 3–2: 2 match points for the winner, 1 match point for the loser

First round
All times are Atlantic Standard Time (UTC−04:00).

Pool A

|}

|}

Pool B

|}

|}

Pool C

|}

|}

Pool D

|}

|}

Second round
All times are Atlantic Standard Time (UTC−04:00).

Pool E

|}

|}

Pool F

|}

|}

Pool G

|}

|}

Pool H

|}

|}

Final round
All times are Atlantic Standard Time (UTC−04:00).

Classification 13th–16th

13th–16th semifinals

|}

15th place match

|}

13th place match

|}

Classification 9th–12th

9th–12th semifinals

|}

11th place match

|}

9th place match

|}

Classification 5th–8th

5th–8th semifinals

|}

7th place match

|}

5th place match

|}

Final four

Semifinals

|}

3rd place match

|}

Final

|}

Final standing

Awards

Most Valuable Player

Best Setter

Best Outside Spikers

	
	
Best Middle Blockers

Best Opposite

Best Libero

See also
2015 FIVB Volleyball Men's U21 World Championship

References

External links

FIVB Volleyball Women's U20 World Championship
FIVB Volleyball Women's U20 World Championship
FIVB Volleyball Women's U20 World Championship
International volleyball competitions hosted by Puerto Rico
2015 in youth sport